Verrucosidin is a toxic pyrone-type polyketide produced by Penicillium aurantiogriseum, Penicillium melanoconidium, and Penicillium polonicum.

References

2-Pyrones
Epoxides
Verrucosidin
Polyketides
Lactones
Methoxy compounds